The Death of Greeley Estates is the fifth full-length album by Greeley Estates. It was released on August 9, 2011, through Tragic Hero Records.

Background
The Death of Greeley Estates was produced by Cory Spotts. It was originally scheduled to be released on August 2 but was delayed due to obligations with Tragic Hero. The first single from the album, "The Last Dance", was released on June 1, 2011.

Sound
Before its release, Zimmerman explained the album's ideas to AMP magazine by saying, "We’re thinking of kind of combining the last two records, Go West and No Rain, to kind of bring back some singing and have a little bit of melody but still have the heavy. I’m not sure yet on the lyrical direction."

"I think it’s a new challenge. I think trying to do something that we didn’t do on the record before-we want to have a little bit of a shock value each time. The last two albums were a shock to people as far as what was coming from Greeley Estates. We started off some of early albums with pop songs so we’ve changed a lot over the years but we want to kind of have that same approach going into this record too. We just want to try and figure out what we can do to combine the things we know our fans love and what we love to perform but also do something a little different."

Track listing

Charts

Personnel
Greeley Estates
 Ryan Zimmerman – lead vocals
 Brandon Hackenson – guitars, programming
 David Ludlow – guitars
 Kyle Koelsch - bass guitar
 Chris Julian – drums
Production
Produced by Cory Spotts
Recorded by Blue Light Studio, Phoenix, Arizona
Instrument production on "December" by George White
Art, design/layout by Brian Trummel

References

Greeley Estates albums
2011 albums
Tragic Hero Records albums